"You've Changed" is a popular song published in 1942 with music by Carl Fischer and words by Bill Carey. The melody features descending chromaticism. The song was first recorded on October 24, 1941 by Harry James & His Orchestra (vocal by Dick Haymes).

Cover versions
The song has since been recorded by many artists, including Billie Holiday on her 1958 album Lady in Satin. A recording by Connie Russell briefly reached the Billboard charts in 1954. Miki Howard recorded a cover on her 1987 album Love Confessions and George Michael covered "You’ve Changed" on his 1999 album Songs from the Last Century. Eva Cassidy recorded live at the Blues Alley, on January 3, 1996, and released in her posthumous album Imagine (2002) and Nightbird (2015).

References

Jazz songs
1941 songs
Eva Cassidy songs
Songs written by Carl T. Fischer